The Man, the Myth, the Legend is the first solo album by American musician El Duce. It was released in 1991.

In 2008, selections from the release were bootlegged as a picture disc under the title "Slutfucking Man".

Track list 
 Slutfucking Man
 Funhole
 Prolong Creme
 Never Ending Search for Pleasure
 Plain Jane with the Pea Brain
 Backside Glide
 Forcin' Sex
 Quiet in the Squat
 White Trash Man
 Turn Out the Lights
 Hershey Highway
 Tons of Fun
 Slave Thing
 its me ya boi 

1991 debut albums